Deeth (Shoshoni language: Teai)  is an unincorporated community and census-designated place near the intersection of Interstate 80 and Nevada State Route 230 in Elko County, Nevada, United States.

History
When the Central Pacific started running past this site in 1869, a branch line station with telegraph was established. In 1875, a post office was established for nearby ranches and farms. The community was named after a pioneer citizen.

As ranching and mining activity increased in the area the town grew in size. The Western Pacific began running through Deeth in 1910. At the time, the community had mercantile stores, a Mormon chapel, livery stables, hotels, saloons, a blacksmith and a population of approximately 250. Many dairies and farms were in the county and this town served as a depot to ship cattle and a trading center for local ranchers and ranchers from nearby counties.

In 1915, a fire destroyed most of the town. The post office has been in operation at Deeth since 1875.  Little remains of the original community.

Climate
According to the Köppen Climate Classification system, Deeth has a warm-summer humid continental climate, abbreviated "Dfb" on climate maps.

References

Unincorporated communities in Nevada
Unincorporated communities in Elko County, Nevada
Elko, Nevada micropolitan area
Census-designated places in Nevada